Kiril Pandov (born 7 March 1983) is a Bulgarian short track speed skater. He competed in two events at the 2002 Winter Olympics.

References

External links
 

1983 births
Living people
Bulgarian male short track speed skaters
Olympic short track speed skaters of Poland
Short track speed skaters at the 2002 Winter Olympics
Sportspeople from Sofia